Henry Aitken may refer to:

Henry Aitken (cricketer) (1831–1915), English cricketer
Henry Aitken (mayor) (1840–1899), mayor of Oamaru, New Zealand
Henry Aitken Wise (1835–1922), New Zealand publisher
Henry Aiken Worcester (1802–1841), American clergyman